The canton of Évreux-2 is an administrative division of the Eure department, northern France. It was created at the French canton reorganisation which came into effect in March 2015. Its seat is in Évreux.

It consists of the following communes:

Aviron
Le Boulay-Morin
La Chapelle-du-Bois-des-Faulx
Dardez
Émalleville
Évreux (partly)
Gravigny
Irreville
Normanville
Reuilly
Saint-Germain-des-Angles
Saint-Vigor

References

Cantons of Eure